Guillermo Varela Olivera (born 24 March 1993) is a Uruguayan professional footballer who plays as a right-back for Campeonato Brasileiro Série A club Flamengo, on loan from Dynamo Moscow, and the Uruguay national team.

Varela began his career with Peñarol, in his home town of Montevideo, before joining Manchester United in 2013. He made 11 first-team appearances for United and spent time on loan at Real Madrid's reserve team, Real Madrid Castilla, and at Eintracht Frankfurt, before rejoining Peñarol in 2017. Varela won two Uruguayan Primera División titles with Peñarol, before returning to Europe in January 2019 when he signed for Danish club Copenhagen. He made 53 appearances for Copenhagen and helped them win the 2018–19 Danish Superliga. In October 2020, he joined Russian club Dynamo Moscow on a loan deal, which was made permanent in July 2021.

Varela was a member of Uruguay's under-20 team that was runners-up in the 2013 FIFA U-20 World Cup. He made his senior international debut in November 2017 and has played at two FIFA World Cups, in 2018 and 2022.

Club career

Peñarol
Born in Montevideo, Varela started his career with his hometown club Peñarol and made his senior debut on 5 June 2011, in a 1–0 home defeat against Racing Club de Montevideo, on the last matchday of Uruguayan Primera División.

Manchester United and loan to Real Madrid Castilla
In May 2013, Varela went on a two-week trial with Manchester United after an impressive performance at the 2013 South American Youth Championship. On 7 June, Varela announced he was having a medical, and on 11 June, United completed his signing on afive-year contract, becoming the first signing of new manager David Moyes.

In September 2014, Varela joined Real Madrid reserve side Real Madrid Castilla for a season-long loan. He was, however, included in the 2014–15 UEFA Champions League squad for the first-team and he was given the squad number 28. He made 33 appearances and scored once, when he was set up by Martin Ødegaard in a 4–0 win over Barakaldo on 21 February 2015, at the Estadio Alfredo Di Stéfano in the season's Segunda División B.

Return to United and loan to Eintracht Frankfurt
After returning to United, Varela was included in their squad for the group stage of the 2015–16 UEFA Champions League. He made his debut on 5 December 2015, as a half-time substitute for Paddy McNair in a goalless Premier League draw against West Ham United at Old Trafford. Three days later, Varela made his first start and Champions League debut in the 2015–16 UEFA Champions League, playing the full 90 minutes in a 3–2 defeat to Wolfsburg. On 25 February 2016, in a Europa League Round of 32 return leg against FC Midtjylland, he assisted on the second of the two goals Marcus Rashford scored on his senior debut. On 19 April, Varela scored an injury-time winner to win Manchester United Under-21s the 2015–16 U21 Premier League title.

Upon the arrival of José Mourinho as United manager in 2016, Varela came on as a substitute in Mourinho's first match in charge of the team, a 2–0 friendly win away to Wigan Athletic. However, he was not included in Mourinho's squad for the club's summer tour of China, and on 23 July, Varela joined German club Eintracht Frankfurt on a season-long loan deal.

Frankfurt coach Niko Kovač revealed at the end of the season that Varela was expected to play in the 2017 DFB-Pokal Final and be given an extension, but these plans were abandoned after Varela defied the instructions of the club's training staff and got a tattoo, which later became inflamed. Because of this, and other disciplinary issues, Varela was suspended by the club, who said that they would not be attempting to extend his loan deal.

Return to Peñarol
On 12 August 2017, Varela returned to Peñarol on a permanent deal. He made his second debut for the club on 20 August 2017, in 4–0 win against El Tanque Sisley.

FC Copenhagen
On 20 December 2018, Danish Superliga team FC Copenhagen announced that Varela would join them in January 2019, on a deal until June 2023.

Dynamo Moscow
On 17 October 2020, he joined Russian Premier League club FC Dynamo Moscow on loan for the 2020–21 season.

On 17 July 2021, he moved to Dynamo Moscow on a permanent basis and signed a two-year contract with the club. He was voted player of the month by Dynamo fans for October 2021.

Flamengo
On 30 July 2022, Flamengo signed Varela on loan from Dynamo Moscow until 31 May 2023.

On 12 January 2023 Flamengo announced that Varela, previously on loan, signed a pre contract for a permanent deal starting at the end of his constract with Dynamo Moscow on 1 July 2023.

International career
Varela made 29 appearances for the Uruguay under-20 team. He played for Uruguay at the 2013 FIFA U-20 World Cup, where the team finished as runners-up to champions France.

On 5 March 2016, following his emergence into the Manchester United first-team, Varela received his first call-up to the Uruguay senior squad, for the World Cup qualifiers against Brazil and Peru later that same month.

In June 2018, Varela was named in Uruguay's final 23-man squad for the 2018 FIFA World Cup in Russia.

Varela was named in Uruguay's squad for the 2022 FIFA World Cup. He came on as a substitute in the 88th minute in Uruguay's first game of the tournament – against South Korea, replacing Facundo Pellistri.

Career statistics

Club

International

Honours
Peñarol
Uruguayan Primera División: 2017, 2018
Supercopa Uruguaya: 2018

Copenhagen
Danish Superliga: 2018–19

Flamengo
Copa Libertadores: 2022

References

External links

Living people
1993 births
Footballers from Montevideo
Association football fullbacks
Uruguayan footballers
Uruguayan people of Galician descent
Uruguay international footballers
Uruguay under-20 international footballers
Uruguayan people of Spanish descent
Peñarol players
Manchester United F.C. players
Real Madrid Castilla footballers
Eintracht Frankfurt players
F.C. Copenhagen players
FC Dynamo Moscow players
CR Flamengo footballers
Uruguayan Primera División players
Segunda División B players
Premier League players
Bundesliga players
Russian Premier League players
Campeonato Brasileiro Série A players
Copa Libertadores-winning players
2018 FIFA World Cup players
2022 FIFA World Cup players
Uruguayan expatriate sportspeople in England
Uruguayan expatriate sportspeople in Spain
Uruguayan expatriate sportspeople in Germany
Uruguayan expatriate sportspeople in Denmark
Uruguayan expatriate sportspeople in Russia
Uruguayan expatriate sportspeople in Brazil
Expatriate footballers in England
Expatriate footballers in Spain
Expatriate footballers in Germany
Expatriate men's footballers in Denmark
Expatriate footballers in Russia
Expatriate footballers in Brazil
Uruguayan expatriate footballers